Shuhei Otsuki (大槻 周平, born May 26, 1989) is a Japanese football player for Renofa Yamaguchi FC.

Club statistics
Updated to end of 2018 season.

References

External links
Profile at Vissel Kobe

1989 births
Living people
Osaka Gakuin University alumni
Association football people from Kyoto Prefecture
Japanese footballers
J1 League players
J2 League players
Shonan Bellmare players
Vissel Kobe players
Montedio Yamagata players
JEF United Chiba players
Renofa Yamaguchi FC players
Association football forwards